Manic is the fourth studio album by American metalcore band Wage War. The album was released on October 1, 2021, through Fearless Records. It was produced by Drew Fulk, Andrew Wade, Jeremy McKinnon and Cody Quistad.

Background and promotion
On April 8, 2020, while on their downtime during the period of self-isolation caused by COVID-19 pandemic, Wage War announced on Twitter that they were working on new material for their upcoming record. Along with the announcement, the band also teased a song and wrote: "Making the most of quarantine. #ww4"

On August 6, the band officially released the single "High Horse" along with its music video. On August 25, almost three weeks after the release of "High Horse", the band unveiled the second single "Circle the Drain". At the same time, the band revealed the album itself, the album cover, the track list, and release date. To promote the album, the band also announced that they will support I Prevail's rescheduled European tour along with Dream State in March 2022. On September 14, the band released the third single "Teeth".

During an interview, Cody Quistad revealed that Manic features "songs for the new fans and also the old, but then there's some brand new stuff that I feel like I've never heard bands do before."

Critical reception

The album received generally positive reviews from critics. Distorted Sound scored the album 8 out of 10 and said: "This release, Manic, is a roundup of what the band has felt for the past year and a half, saying that they effectively lost their jobs which obviously came with a lot of frustration. Pairing this with the desire to try out new things with their sound, the results are an album that's well worth your attention." Kerrang! gave the album 4 out of 5 and stated: "It's not a perfect album, and it won't please every fan, but Manic represents a new step forward and when it hits home it absolutely slays. Get ready to Wage War once more." Rock 'N' Load praised the album saying, "Overall, this album is solid, it showcases what Wage War are all about and the progression from their prior albums. Whilst there is nothing new and ground-breaking, it's an impressive showing from the Florida based Quintet and one I'll be listening to after finishing this review." Adam Rice of Wall of Sound gave the album the score 7.5/10, writing: "In my opinion, this isn't Wage War's finest work. It definitely has its moments and had me on the edge of my seat in some songs but there are a few too many skip-worthy tracks that unfortunately dull the shine that Manic had the potential to offer. However, I do encourage everyone to give it a chance and to come up with their own conclusion."

Track listing

Notes
 "Circle the Drain" has been re-released as a stripped-down version but doesn't appear on the album.

Personnel
Wage War
 Briton Bond – lead vocals, additional guitars
 Seth Blake – lead guitar, backing vocals
 Cody Quistad – rhythm guitar, clean vocals, production, engineering
 Chris Gaylord – bass, backing vocals
 Stephen Kluesener – drums

Additional personnel
 Drew Fulk – production, engineering, mixing, mastering
 Andrew Wade – production, engineering
 Jeremy McKinnon – production
 Jeff Dunne – engineering, mixing, mastering

Charts

References

2021 albums
Wage War albums
Fearless Records albums